The Semnița is a left tributary of the river Moravița in Romania. It discharges into the Moravița in Dejan.

References

Rivers of Romania
Rivers of Timiș County